Whalley Range  may refer to:

 Whalley Range, Manchester, England
 Whalley Range, Blackburn, Lancashire, England